Gilloblennius tripennis, known commonly as the thripenny, is a species of triplefin blenny in the genus Gilloblennius. It was described by Johann Reinhold Forster in 1801. It is endemic to New Zealand where it is found throughout the mainland and off the Three Kings Islands, Snares Island and Chatham Islands.

References

Thripenny
Fish described in 1801